The Bonneville cisco (Prosopium gemmifer) is a species of cisco endemic to Bear Lake along the Utah-Idaho border, United States. It is one of three species of whitefish endemic to Bear Lake, the others being the Bear Lake whitefish and the Bonneville whitefish.

The species is listed as a Wildlife Species of Concern by the Utah Division of Wildlife Resources.

References 

 

Prosopium
Fish of the Western United States
Taxa named by John Otterbein Snyder
Fish described in 1919